Tuesdays with Morrie is a 1999 American made-for-television film adaptation of Mitch Albom's book of the same title. Directed by Mick Jackson, it features Jack Lemmon in a role for which he won an Emmy award. The film originally aired on ABC on December 5, 1999.

Plot
In 1995, Mitch Albom (Hank Azaria) became caught up with his career as a sport commentator and journalist. His girlfriend, Janine (Wendy Moniz), a backup singer feels that he never places her as a priority. Mitch is consistently doing six things at once. One evening, while on the telephone with Janine, Mitch flips through TV channels and lands on an edition of Nightline where he sees his former professor Morrie Schwartz (Jack Lemmon) being interviewed by Ted Koppel. Morrie discusses his current health and lets everyone know he is dying of Amyotrophic lateral sclerosis, often referred to as "Lou Gehrig's disease" or ALS. Morrie, a retired sociology professor from Brandeis University, comes on the show to describe his final journey.

As life goes on with work and balancing his relationship with Janine, Mitch feels bothered he never got a chance to visit his old professor. Feeling so moved by the interview, Mitch reaches out for a visit with Morrie after sixteen years of no contact. Morrie has an affinity with food and it becomes a regular endeavor with his visits with Mitch. Office hours during university were on Tuesdays, Morrie would grade papers and critique student’s assignments, Mitch now makes it a habit to visit him every Tuesday. Connie (Caroline Aaron), Morrie’s home nurse, is his primary care taker. After leaving Morrie, Mitch continues working and can’t find a groove with Janine.

Mitch returns and witnesses a “living funeral” where friends and family come to honor Morrie while he is still alive, per Morrie’s request. As the two get reacquainted, they participate in several thoughtful and reflective conversations about various substantial topics. Morrie divulges in many stories on his time as a young boy and how his relationships unfolded between his mother, stepmother, and father. Back home Mitch continues with his impressive and busy journalism career, and while out on a story he receives a call from Janine breaking up with him.

Another visit prompts Mitch to officially bring a recording device to capture all of Morrie’s powerful pieces of advice and all his anecdotes. Morrie and Mitch grow closer and closer with each visit, some significant topics that were explored were death, love, marriage, family, and relationships. The time spent with Morrie starts to affect Mitch’s position at work, he argues with his boss and decides to prioritize his visits with Morrie. Mitch, being so immersed in this new world asks Connie to teach him a few skills to aid Morrie when no one else is around. New tasks Mitch learns include: helping Morrie in and out of his wheelchair, using his oxygen tank, feeding Morrie, and even special massages.

Finding value and meaning in Morrie’s advice, Mitch proposes to Janine via letter. She rejects him and comes along on one of his visits to Morrie’s home. Janine notices a change in Mitch’s personality in the way he knows what to do around Morrie from the oxygen tank assistance to cleaning Morrie’s crying eyes. Janine and Morrie speak without Mitch in the room. Later, on an airplane on their way home Mitch and Janine make up and decide a proper proposal should take place.

On a rainy visit, Mitch brings Morrie food, but learns he has not been able to eat solid foods for some time. Charlotte (Bonnie Bartlett), Morrie’s wife advises Mitch that his visits have a great impact on Morrie. Mitch notices how the illness is progressing in a devastating way. They continue to go back and forth on difficult topics, regret, spiritual life, forgiveness, and love. Morrie reiterates that we all, as humans, must love one another or die. He recounts the story of his father’s death. Mitch receives a call from Walter (John Carroll Lynch), his boss, and they find middle ground to allow Mitch to write again. Mitch takes Janine to the islands and proposes to her there. Once back home, Mitch requests to have all of his Tuesdays off to continue his visits with Morrie.

On a snowy visit, Mitch asks Morrie what a perfect day would be like. Morrie gives a simple answer with friends, family, food, dancing, and choosing his burial site. Morrie asks Mitch to visit once he has passed, breaking his heart. Mitch cries and hugs his old friend. Mitch promises to come back next Tuesday. Morrie dies Saturday morning, Janine and Mitch receive a call. Charlotte keeps his funeral small, and all the people in his perfect day are included. The funeral is held on a Tuesday.

Cast and characters
 Jack Lemmon – Morrie Schwartz
 Hank Azaria – Mitch Albom
 Wendy Moniz – Janine, Mitch's girlfriend
 Caroline Aaron – Connie, Morrie's home nurse
 Bonnie Bartlett – Charlotte Schwartz, Morrie's wife
 Aaron Lustig – Rabbi Al Axelrod
 Bruce Nozick – Mr. Schwartz
 Ivo Cutzarida – Armand
 John Carroll Lynch – Walter Moran, Mitch's boss from the sports column
 Kyle Sullivan – Young Morrie
 Dan Thiel – Shawn Daley
 Christian Meoli – Aldo
 John Billingsley – Sports Fan #1

Reception
The review aggregator Rotten Tomatoes give it a 71% rating based on 7 reviews. Fred Topel from About.com says, "Movie of the week with film caliber performances". Common Sense Media Editors states, "Oprah Winfrey presents a three-hanky weepfest".

Ratings
The film brought in a 15.2/22 rating/share, and was watched by 22.5 million viewers, ranking as the most watched program that week.

Awards and nominations

Notes

References

External links
 
 
 Tuesdays with Morrie  on slanting-n

1990s biographical drama films
1999 drama films
1999 films
1999 television films
American biographical drama films
American television films
Films based on non-fiction books
Films based on works by Mitch Albom
Films directed by Mick Jackson
Films scored by Marco Beltrami
Films set in the 20th century
Harpo Productions films
Primetime Emmy Award for Outstanding Made for Television Movie winners
Television films based on books
1990s English-language films
1990s American films